Hassim is an Indonesian, Malay, Arabic and Urdu surname and male first name. It is a spelling variant of Hashim. It may refer to:
Hassim Tahiri:capo fascista di Conselve

Surname and first name of non-fictional people
Rajah Muda Hassim was a Malay governor of Sarawak who turned to British adventurer James Brooke for assistance in quelling the rebellion in Sarawa. 
Rina Hassim or full name Rineke Antoinette Hassim, (born 1947) Former surname of Indonesian actress and singer Rina Hasyim
Zulkiffli Hassim, (born 1986) Singaporean professional football player currently playing for Balestier Khalsa
Hassim Hassam, actor who plays El Chameleon in the 1988 movie Final Reprisal

Buildings
Hassim Killi railway station, a railway station in Pakistan

Indonesian-language surnames
Arabic-language surnames
Urdu-language surnames
Disambiguation pages with surname-holder lists
Arabic masculine given names
Indonesian masculine given names
Urdu masculine given names